Carlos is a masculine given name, and is the Portuguese and Spanish variant of the English name Charles, from the Germanic Carl.

Notable people with the name include:

Royalty 
Carlos I of Portugal (1863–1908), second to last King of Portugal
Charles V, Holy Roman Emperor (1500–1558), Holy Roman Emperor (Karl V) and King of Spain (Carlos I)
Carlos II of Spain, last Habsburg King in Spain
Carlos, Prince of Asturias (1545–1568), son of King Philip II
Carlos III (1716-1788), King of Spain from 10 August 1759 to 14 December 1788
Carlos IV (1748-1819), King of Spain from 14 December 1788, until his abdication on 19 March 1808
Infante Carlos, Count of Molina (1788–1855), first of the Carlist claimants to the throne of Spain
Carlos (Calusa) (died 1567), king of the Calusa people of Florida
 Carlos Felipe de Schwarzenberg
 Carlos Hugo, Duke of Parma (1930–2010), Carlist claimant to the throne of Spain
 Prince Carlos, Duke of Parma (born 1970), Carlist claimant to the throne of Spain
 Prince Carlos Hugo Roderik Sybren de Bourbon de Parme (b. 1997), son of Prince Carlos, Duke of Parma
 Carlos, Prince of Piacenza (b. 2016), son of Prince Carlos, Duke of Parma

People in media 
Carlos Alazraqui (born 1962), American stand-up comedian and actor
Carlos Bernard (born 1962), American actor
Carlos Bustamante, Canadian television personality; former YTV host from 2002-2018 and current reporter of Entertainment Tonight Canada since 2017
Carlos (DJ) (born in Swindon, Wiltshire), UK Radio Presenter
Carlos Caridad-Montero (born 1967), Venezuelan film director
Carlos Castro (journalist) (1945–2011), Portuguese journalist & murder victim
 Carlos Irwin Estévez (Charlie Sheen, born 1965), American actor
Carlos Gutierrez, U.S. Secretary of Commerce
Carlos Mencia (born 1967), comedian, host of Mind of Mencia on Comedy Central
 Carlos Ray Norris (Chuck Norris, born 1940), American actor and martial artist
Carlos Pesquera, (born 1956), Puerto Rican civil engineer
Carlos Saldanha, Brazilian director
Carlos Watson (journalist) (born 1969), American television host, lawyer, and businessman

People in music 
Carlos Alomar (born 1951), American guitarist, composer and arranger
Carlos do Carmo (1939–2021), Portuguese fado singer
Carlos Cavazo, guitarist in Quiet Riot
Carlos Chávez (1899–1978), Mexican composer, conductor, and educator
Carlos Dengler (born 1974), American actor, bassist, and founding member of the band Interpol
Carlos Gardel (1890–1935), prominent figure in the history of tango music
Carlos Montoya (1903–1993), prominent flamenco guitarist
Carlos PenaVega (born 1989), American singer, dancer and actor
Carlos Ponce (born 1972), Puerto Rican actor, singer, composer and television personality
Carlos Santana (born 1947), Mexican musician, leader of the band Santana
Carlos Vives (born 1961), Colombian singer
Carlos Ward (born 1940), jazz alto saxophonist and flautist

People in sport

Carlos Alcaraz (born 2003), Spanish tennis player
Carlos Basham Jr. (born 1997), American football player
Carlos Davis (American football) (born 1996), American football player
Carlos Garay (born 1972), American football player
Carlos Henderson (born 1994), American football player
Carlos Hendricks (born 1983), American football player
Carlos Huertas (born 1991) Colombian racing driver
Carlos James (American football) (born 1972), American football player
Carlos Joseph (1980-2021), American football player
Carlos Moyá (born 1976), Spanish tennis player
Carlos Muñoz (racing driver) (born 1992), Colombian racing driver
Carlos Nieto (born 1976), Italian-Argentine rugby union player
Carlos Sainz (born 1962), Spanish World Rally Championship driver, 1990 and 1992 champion.
Carlos Sainz Jr. (born 1994), Formula 1 driver for Scuderia Ferrari
Carlos Watkins (born 1993), American football player

Baseball players 
Carlos Almanzar, Dominican baseball player
Carlos Baerga, Puerto Rican baseball player
Carlos Beltrán (born 1977), Puerto Rican baseball player
Carlos Bernier, Puerto Rican baseball player
Carlos Carrasco (baseball),  Venezuelan baseball player
Carlos Casimiro, Dominican baseball player
Carlos Castillo (baseball), American baseball player
Carlos Corporán, Puerto Rican baseball player
Carlos Correa, Puerto Rican baseball player
Carlos Crawford, American baseball player
Carlos Delgado (born 1972), Puerto Rican baseball player
Carlos Diaz (catcher), American baseball player
Carlos Diaz (pitcher), American baseball player
Carlos Estévez (baseball), Dominican baseball player
Carlos Febles, Dominican baseball player
Carlos Fisher, American baseball player
Carlos García (baseball), Venezuelan baseball player
Carlos Gómez, Dominican baseball player 
Carlos González (baseball), Venezuelan baseball player
Carlos Guevara, American baseball player
Carlos Guillén, Venezuelan baseball player
Carlos Hernández (catcher), Venezuelan baseball player
Carlos Hernández (infielder), Venezuelan baseball player
Carlos Hernández (pitcher, born 1980), Venezuelan baseball player
Carlos Hernández (pitcher, born 1997), Venezuelan baseball player
Carlos Lee (born 1976), Panamanian baseball player
Carlos Lezcano, Puerto Rican baseball player
Carlos López (baseball), Mexican baseball player
Carlos Maldonado (catcher), Venezuelan baseball player
Carlos Maldonado (pitcher), Panamanian baseball player
Carlos Marmol, Dominican baseball player
Carlos Martínez (infielder), Venezuelan baseball player
Carlos Martínez (pitcher, born 1982), Dominican baseball player
Carlos Martínez (pitcher, born 1991), Dominican baseball player
Carlos May (born 1948), American baseball player
Carlos Méndez (baseball), Venezuelan baseball player
Carlos Mendoza (outfielder), Venezuelan baseball player
Carlos Monasterios, Venezuelan baseball player
Carlos Moore, American baseball player
Carlos Muñiz, American baseball player
Carlos Pascual (baseball), Cuban baseball player
Carlos Paula, Cuban baseball player
Carlos Peguero, Dominican baseball player
Carlos Peña, Dominican baseball player
Carlos Pérez (baseball), Dominican baseball player 
Carlos Pérez (catcher, born 1996), Venezuelan baseball player
Carlos Ponce (baseball), Puerto Rican baseball player
Carlos Pulido, Venezuelan baseball player
Carlos Quentin, American baseball player
Carlos Quintana (baseball), Venezuelan baseball player
Carlos Reyes (baseball), American baseball player 
Carlos Rivera (baseball), Puerto Rican baseball player
Carlos Rodón, American baseball player
Carlos Rodríguez (baseball), Mexican baseball player
Carlos Rosa, Dominican baseball player
Carlos Ruiz (baseball) (born 1979), Panamanian baseball player
Carlos Santana (baseball), Dominican baseball player
Carlos Silva (baseball), Venezuelan baseball player
Carlos Torres (pitcher), American baseball player
Carlos Triunfel, Dominican baseball player
Carlos Valderrama (baseball) (born 1977), Venezuelan baseball player
Carlos Valdez (baseball), Dominican baseball player
Carlos Velázquez (baseball), Puerto Rican baseball player
Carlos Villanueva (baseball), Dominican baseball player
Carlos Zambrano (born 1981), American baseball player

Basketball players 
Carlos Almeida (born 1976), Angolan basketball player
Carlos Arroyo (born 1979), Puerto Rican basketball player
Carlos Delfino, (born 1982), Argentine NBA basketball player
Carlos Boozer, (born 1981), American NBA basketball player

Cyclists 
Carlos Jaramillo (born 1961), Colombian road cyclist
Carlos Alberto Contreras (born 1973), Colombian road cyclist
Carlos Humberto Cabrera (born 1973), Colombian road cyclist
Carlos Silva (cyclist) (born 1974), Colombian cyclist
Carlos Sastre (born 1975), Spanish cyclist
Carlos Alzate (born 1983), Colombian track and road cyclist

Fighters 
Carlos Augusto Filho (born 1986), Brazilian mixed martial artist and kickboxer
Carlos Valcárcel (born 1981), Puerto Rican boxer
Carlos Varela (wrestler) (born 1966), Cuban wrestler
Carlos Julian Ortíz (born 1974), Cuban freestyle wrestler
Carlos Motta (judoka) (1955–2018), Brazilian judoka
Carlos Fonseca (boxer) (born 1955), Brazilian boxer
Carlos Luis Campos (born 1980), Venezuelan boxer
Carly Colón (born 1979), professional wrestler, WWE
Carlos Condit (born 1984), American mixed martial artist
Carlos Honorato (born 1974), Brazilian judoka

Footballers 
Carlos Abad (born 1995), Spanish footballer
Carlos Bocanegra (born 1979), American soccer player
Carlos Alberto Carvalho da Silva Júnior (born 1995), Brazilian football forward
Carlos Chaínho (born 1974), Portuguese footballer
Carlos Diogo (born 1983), Uruguayan footballer
Carlos Edwards (born 1978), Trinidadian footballer
Carlos Fernandes (footballer, born 1978), Portuguese football defender
Carlos Fernandes (footballer, born 1979), Portuguese football goalkeeper
Carlos Fernández (footballer, born 1984), Peruvian footballer
Carlos Fernández (footballer, born 1996), Spanish footballer
Carlos Gruezo (footballer, born 1975), Ecuadorian footballer
Carlos Gruezo (footballer, born 1995), Ecuadorian footballer
Carlos Guirland (born 1968), Paraguayan football midfielder
Carlos Isaac (footballer) (born 1988), Spanish footballer
Carlos Martins (footballer) (born 1982), Portuguese footballer
Carlos Muñoz Cobo (born 1961), Spanish footballer, known as "Carlos"
Carlos Muñoz (Chilean footballer) (born 1989), Chilean footballer
Carlos Muñoz (Ecuadorian footballer) (1967–1993), Ecuadorian footballer
Carlos Muñoz (Mexican footballer) (born 1959), Mexican footballer
Carlos Ochoa (born 1978), Mexican footballer
Carlos Queiroz (born 1953), Portuguese football manager
Carlos Santos de Jesus (born 1985), Brazilian football defender
Carlos Pérez Salvachúa (born 1973), Spanish football manager
Carlos Soca (born 1969), Uruguayan footballer
Carlos Tevez (born 1984), Argentine footballer
Carlos Valderrama (born 1961), Colombian footballer player known as El Pibe

Gymnasts
Carlos Yulo (born 2000), Filipino artistic gymnast

Runners 
Carlos Moreno (athlete) (born 1967), Chilean track and field sprinter
Carlos Patrício (born 1964), Portuguese long-distance runner
Carlos Retiz (born 1968), Mexican long-distance runner
Carlos Tarazona (born 1966), Venezuelan long-distance runner

Swimmers 
Carlos Berrocal (born 1957), Puerto Rican swimmer
Carlos Ventosa (born 1971), Spanish backstroke swimmer

Volleyball players 
Carlos Weber (born 1966), Argentine volleyball player
Carlos Carreño (born 1973), Spanish volleyball player
Carlos Teixeira (born 1976), Portuguese volleyball player
Carlos Tejeda (born 1980), Venezuelan volleyball player

Other people

Carlos Acosta (born 1973), Cuban ballet dancer 
Carlos Agassi (born 1979), Filipino actor, rap artist, host, and model.
Carlos Agostinho do Rosário (born 1954), Prime Minister of Mozambique
Carlos Anwandter (1801–1889), German political exile who emigrated to Chile
Carlos Arroyo (architect), Spanish architect
Carlos Arruza (1920–1966), Mexican bullfighter
Carlos Bunga (born 1976), Portuguese artist
Carlos Camacho (1924–1979), first elected governor of Guam
Carlos Cardoen (born 1942), Chilean metallurgical engineer
Carlos Castaneda (1925–1998), American author
Carlos Cheppi (born 1955), Argentine diplomat
Carlos Cisneros (1948–2019), New Mexico state senator
 Carlos Danger, 2013, alias used by New York City Mayoral candidate Anthony Weiner for sexting
Carlos Dominguez III (born 1945), Filipino businessman
Carlos Escudé (1948–2021), Argentine academic and writer
Carlos Fuentes (1928–2012), Mexican writer
Carlos P. Garcia (1896–1971), eighth Filipino president and poet
Carlos Ghosn (born 1954), former chairman and CEO of the Renault-Nissan-Mitsubishi Alliance
Carlos Gustavo Moreira, Brazilian mathematician
Carlos Gutierrez (born 1953), Cuban American, 35th U.S. Secretary of Commerce and former Chairman of the Board and CEO of the Kellogg Company
Carlos Howard, Governor of West Florida between 1792 and 93 
Carlos Marighella (1911–1969), Brazilian leading thinker on urban guerrilla warfare
Carlos Menchaca (born 1980), American politician, New York City Mayoral candidate
Brother Carlos Oliveira (born 1989), Christian exorcist, and deliverance minister
Carlos Pérez de Bricio (1927–2022), Spanish businessman and politician
Carlos P. Romulo (1898–1985), Filipino politician who was formerly a president of the UN General Assembly
Carlos Salinas de Gortari (born 1948), President of Mexico from 1988–1994
Carlos Simpson (born 1962), American mathematician
Carlos Slim (born 1940; full name Carlos Slim Helú), Mexican businessman
Carlos Slim Domit (born 1967), Mexican businessman and son of Carlos Slim Helú
Carlos Solchaga (born 1944), Spanish politician and businessman
Carlos the Jackal, the nom de guerre of Ilich Ramírez Sánchez (born 1949), a Venezuelan assassin and terrorist serving a life sentence for murder in France
Carlos Urbizo, Honduran politician and economist
Carlos Isagani Zarate (born 1967), Filipino politician

Multiple people
Carlos Imperial (disambiguation)

Fictional characters

 Carlos, a character in the video game Saints Row 2
 Carlos, a henchman to Le Chiffre in the 2006 James Bond film Casino Royale
 Carlos, a meerkat in the 2005 to 2008 Animal Planet televisio. series Meerkat Manor
 Carlos, a character from the Subway Surfers
 Carlos, Cecil's husband from Welcome to Nightvale
Carlos, a protagonist from the video game Zero Time Dilemma
Carlos De Vil, son of Cruella in Descendants
 Carlos Casagrande, one of the main characters of the Nickelodeon animated television series The Casagrandes
 Carlos Lopez, a character in the Transformers Unicron Trilogy, voiced by Matt Hill
Carlos Miyamoto, one of the player characters in the SNES game, Final Fight 2
Carlos Nieto, a paramedic in the television series  Third Watch
Carlos Oliveira (Resident Evil), one of the two protagonists in Resident Evil 3: Nemesis
 Carlos Rivera, a boxer from the manga and anime series Ashita no Joe
Carlos Solis, a character from Desperate Housewives
Carlos Vallerte, the character in two of the Power Rangers series
 Carlos Molina, a character in Netflix's Julie and the Phantoms.
 Don Carlos, the main character of Schiller's eponymous play and the Verdi opera inspired by it, based on a fictional retelling of the Spanish infante's life.

See also

Carles (name)
Carlo (name)
Carlitos
Carlon
Carlos Alberto
José Carlos (disambiguation)
Carlos Antonio (disambiguation)
Karlos (name)

Portuguese masculine given names
Spanish masculine given names